Action Jackson: Original Soundtrack Album is the official soundtrack album for the 1988 film Action Jackson starring Carl Weathers, Vanity, Craig T. Nelson, and Sharon Stone. 
The soundtrack album was produced by Richard Perry, Jeff Lorber, Stevie Salas, as well as Jesse Johnson and Bernadette Cooper. The soundtrack features new music by Herbie Hancock, The Pointer Sisters' R&B hit "He Turned Me Out", LeVert and Sister Sledge.

The soundtrack also includes three new songs by Vanity, "Faraway Eyes" and "Undress" written and produced by former The Time member and musician Jesse Johnson, and "Shotgun" with saxophonist Dave Koz. Koz himself also provides lead vocals on "Shotgun" with Vanity.

Track listing
US, Europe 12" Vinyl LP, record, compact cassette, and CD

References

External links
 
 

Action Jackson (soundtrack album)
Albums produced by Richard Perry
Action film soundtracks